"The Dark of the Matinée" (known as "Matinée" on single versions) is a song by Scottish indie rock band Franz Ferdinand. It was released as the third single from their eponymous debut studio album on 19 April 2004. The song reached number eight on the UK Singles Chart. In Australia, the song was ranked number 50 on Triple J's Hottest 100 of 2004.

Background

The song is about walking home from Bearsden Academy fantasising about a better life in the future, telling Terry Wogan about it on UK national television, then being shaken from the fantasy as its own ridiculousness shatters its very existence. The chorus and title were inspired by bassist Bob Hardy remarking that the dark of a matinée performance was a utopian environment to play in.

Music video
The video features the band dressed as schoolboys, dancing in an automatic, almost possessed, fashion and miming along to the main vocal track. It was inspired by Dennis Potter's television play Blue Remembered Hills (1979), which features adults playing children, and the lip-sync device Potter used in his 'serials with songs' Pennies from Heaven (1978) and The Singing Detective (1986).

Another part of the video sees the band dressed in white clothing and standing in front of a large photograph of Terry Wogan (who is namechecked in the song).

The finale of the video also takes several visual cues from the "Dry Bones" sequence in Singing Detective. Kapranos wanted to shoot the video in the corridors of Bearsden Academy and approached the school who, while initially receptive, ultimately rejected the idea, as the idea of schoolboys in their early 30s was too reminiscent of the recent scandal involving Brian MacKinnon.

Track listings
All lead vocals are performed by Alex Kapranos.

UK CD single
 "Matinée" 
 "Better in Hoboken" 
 "Forty Feet" 

UK 7-inch single
A. "Matinée" 
B. "Michael" (live at KCRW) 

UK 12-inch single
A1. "Matinée" 
B1. "Better in Hoboken" 
B2. "Forty Feet" 

UK DVD single
 "Matinée" (video)
 "Matinée" (live at KCRW)
 Wallpaper
 Photo gallery with "Cheating on You" live from The Chateau)

European CD single
 "Matinée" 
 "Better in Hoboken"

Charts

Weekly charts

Year-end charts

References

2004 singles
2004 songs
Domino Recording Company singles
Franz Ferdinand (band) songs
Songs written by Alex Kapranos
Songs written by Bob Hardy (bassist)
Songs written by Nick McCarthy
UK Independent Singles Chart number-one singles